Maryland Route 367 (MD 367) is a state highway in the U.S. state of Maryland.  Known as Bishopville Road, the state highway runs  from the county-maintained portion of Bishopville Road at Bishop east to the Delaware state line near Bishopville.  MD 367 connects U.S. Route 113 (US 113) with Bishopville and other small communities on the St. Martin Neck in northern Worcester County.  The state highway was constructed between Bishop and Bishopville in two steps in the mid-1920s and early 1930s, respectively.  The segment within Bishopville was constructed as part of an extended MD 368 in the mid-1910s.  The portion from Bishopville to the Delaware state line was constructed in the mid-1930s as MD 568.  All three state highways were reassigned to their present lengths in 1950.

Route description

MD 367 begins on the east side of the Snow Hill Line of the Maryland and Delaware Railroad in the hamlet of Bishop.  Bishopville Road continues west of the railroad track as a county highway.  MD 367 intersects US 113 (Worcester Highway), then continues east as a two-lane undivided road toward Bishopville.  After crossing Buntings Branch of the St. Martin River, the state highway enters Bishopville and intersects MD 368 (St. Martins Neck Road) and MD 568 (Hatchery Road).  MD 367 reaches its eastern terminus at the Delaware state line, where the highway continues northeast as Hudson Road in Sussex County, which leads to an intersection with Delaware Route 54 (DE 54).

History
The first part of MD 367 to be paved was between present day MD 368 and MD 568 in Bishopville.  That segment, plus the present lengths of MD 368 and MD 568, were paved as a state-aid road between 1912 and 1915 and later designated MD 368.  The next segment of modern MD 367 was between the western terminus and just west of Buntings Branch, which was completed by 1923.  The connection over Buntings Branch to MD 368 was finished by 1933.  The remainder of Bishopville Road to the Delaware state line was completed in 1934 and designated MD 568.  MD 367 was extended east from MD 368 to the Delaware state line in 1950 when MD 368 was rolled back to its present length and MD 568 was reassigned to Hatchery Road.

Junction list

See also

References

External links

MDRoads: MD 367

367
Maryland Route 367